Shola is the third and final album released by Pakistani pop music group, Awaz. It was released after Jadu Ka Chiraagh, the band's second album. This album was released in 1996 by Lips Records (Private) Limited and BMG Records (UK) Limited.

Track listing
 Mr. Fraudiay
 Shola
 Mela
 Soniay
 Kabhi Kabhi
 Meray Pass
 Hoga
 Never Get Away
 Shine
 Soniay (Madhouse Remix)
 Shola (Madhouse Remix)

Personnel
All information is taken from the CD.

Awaz
Haroon Rashid – lead vocals
Asad Ahmed – lead guitars
Faakhir Mehmood – vocals, keyboards, piano

External links
Haroon Official Website - includes biography and complete discography of Awaz
Asad Ahmed Official Website
Faakhir Official Website

1996 albums
Awaz albums
Urdu-language albums